Kawthaung (ڤولودوا) is a border town located in the southernmost part of Myanmar, in the Tanintharyi Region. During British rule in Burma between 1824 and 1948, it was known as Victoria Point. As of 2021, it has a population of 57,949. Facing Ranong in Thailand, Kawthaung is one of 7 officialborder trade posts with Thailand.

History 
Rakhine and Tanintharyi were transferred to British rule after the First Anglo-Burmese War of 1823–1826.

In 1859, a local group of Chinese and Thais settled at Maliwan (Thai language) to the north of Kawthaung, a place with numerous lakes and flowering trees. In 1865, an Arab–Malay group led by Nayuda Ahmed, traveling and collecting sea products around Mergui Archipelago started a base and village at the bay of Victoria Point.

In 1872 the third mayor of Mergui District, Sir Ashly Din (1870–1875) assigned the first police officer to be stationed at Maliwan, a village 24 miles north of current Victoria Point. In 1891, the local government offices were moved from Maliwan to Kawthaung because Maliwan is located on the bank of a small shallow river, Maliwan Creek, unsuitable for large ships to enter and waiting tide water.

Geography 
Kawthaung is located about 10°N and 98.30°E at the mouth of Kyan River on the Malay Peninsula. To its east is the Thai border town of Ranong. To its west, and south-west, the Andaman Sea opens up to the Indian Ocean and Bokpyin Township is located to the north. Most of the terrain in the area is mountainous.

Climate
Kawthaung has a tropical monsoon climate (Köppen climate classification Am). Temperatures are hot throughout the year. There is a winter dry season (December-March) and a summer wet season (April-November). Torrential rain falls from May to September, with over  falling in each month.

Demographics 
The majority of Kawthaung's population is made up of Bamar, Thai and other ethnic minorities such as the Shan, Karen, and Mon. Some Thai Muslims, alongside the Salone Sea Gypsies and Malays can also be found in Kawthaung. Burmese Chinese and Burmese Indians, who migrated to Kawthaung during colonial rule for tin mining and other industries also inhabit Kawthaung. Peranakan or Straits Chinese, called Pashu by the Burmese, can also be found in Kawthaung.

The most common spoken language is Burmese, followed by Thai and Southern Thai as well as Shan, Moken, Karen, Mon, Kedah Malay and Chinese and Indian languages..

Most of the Bamar, Thai, Shan, Karen, Mon, Burmese Chinese and some portions of the Salone adhere to Theravada Buddhism. The Malays and Thai Muslims practice Islam.

Economy and local products 
The town is home to one of 7 official border trade posts with Thailand, and opened on 1 June 1996.

The main agriculture products are rubber, betel nut, cashew nut, coconut and oil palm. Mining and wood log industries which flourished in the past have now dried out.

Although Kawthaung has a large port the fishing industry is not as large as in the past because of the government restriction on fishing vessels. Fishing still plays a significant role but engines are restricted to 28 hp. Tourism is bound to play a larger role for the local economy in the future as Myanmar's government is gradually lifting travel and immigration restrictions in the area. Since September 2013, tourists entering the country through Kawthaung are able to continue their journeys on land and exit through any other border crossing.

An 8 megawatt coal-fired power plant was completed in 2012, amid local concerns on pollution issues.

Immigration and Visa entry 

Thai people can cross into Myanmar through Kawthaung by applying for a temporary border pass without a visa. When crossing with a Thai passport, a visa must be applied for in advance since the related bilateral agreement between Thailand and Myanmar has exceptions only when arriving through an airport. Other foreigners must have a passport that is valid for at least another 6 months and are required to pay a fee. The border is popular for visa renewal with tourists staying in Phuket, Ko Tao, Ko Pha Ngan and other places in southern Thailand. A three-day (two-night) visa to Myanmar costs $10 USD.

Sister cities
 Ranong, Thailand

See also
Kawthaung Airport

References

External links

 Kawthaung Map from Google Earth
 http://www.bugbitten.com/blogs/Asia/suziep_nz/Myanmar_Kawthaung.html

Township capitals of Myanmar
Populated places in Tanintharyi Region
Myanmar–Thailand border crossings